David Carr MacAndrew (May 30, 1874 – August 15, 1937) was an American football player and coach. He served as the head football coach at Bowdoin College in 1898, Western Reserve University—now known as Case Western Reserve University—from 1898 to 1899, and Saint Mary's College of California from 1915 to 1916, compiling a career college football coaching record of 19–18–1.

Early life and playing career
MacAndrew was born in Brooklyn, New York, and moved to Braintree, Massachusetts, when he was a year old.  MacAndrew attended the Thayer Academy in Braintree. For his undergraduate career, he attended Dartmouth College, graduating in 1898. He was a member of Theta Delta Chi fraternity.

As a collegiate athlete, he played football at Dartmouth as an end. MacAndrew was a four-year letter winner, playing from 1894 to 1897. MacAndrew was a member of the Dartmouth baseball team. He also played for the Newton Athletic Association against Yale in 1898.

Coaching career

MacAndrew began his coaching career in 1898 for Bowdoin, coaching one game before departing prior to game against Harvard. During the same season, he moved to Cleveland to coach Western Reserve, where he remained for two seasons.

MacAndrew coached for several years at high schools in Toledo, Ohio, and in Alameda, Oakland, and Berkeley in California. In 1915, he returned to college football, coaching at Saint Mary's College of California for two seasons.

Later life and death
MacAndrew later worked as a safety engineer for the Cities Service Refining Company in East Braintree, Massachusetts. He died on August 15, 1937, at his home in Braintree.

Head coaching record

References

External links
 

1874 births
1937 deaths
19th-century players of American football
American football ends
Bowdoin Polar Bears football coaches
Case Western Spartans football coaches
Dartmouth Big Green baseball players
Dartmouth Big Green football players
Saint Mary's Gaels football coaches
High school football coaches in California
High school football coaches in Ohio
Sportspeople from Braintree, Massachusetts
Sportspeople from Brooklyn
Players of American football from New York City
Coaches of American football from Massachusetts
Players of American football from Massachusetts
Baseball players from Massachusetts